Kresge is a surname. Notable people with the surname include:

 Cliff Kresge (born 1968), American golfer
 Geoff Kresge, songwriter, guitarist, bassist, and record producer
 George Joseph Kresge (born 1935), American mentalist, the Amazing Kreskin
 Karen Kresge (born 1957), British choreographer
 Sebastian Spering Kresge (1867–1966), American merchant and philanthropist, founder of Kmart, formerly known as the S. S. Kresge Company

Fictional characters:
 Lynne Kresge, character in the second season of the TV series 24

German-language surnames